Ceratophyllus petrochelidoni is a species of flea in the family Ceratophyllidae. It was described by Wagner in 1936.

References 

Ceratophyllidae
Insects described in 1936